Hadroconus is a genus of sea snails, marine gastropod mollusks in the family Seguenziidae.

Species
Species within the genus Hadroconus include:
Hadroconus altus (Watson, 1879)
Hadroconus diadematus Marshall, 1988
Hadroconus grandiosus Marshall, 1991
Hadroconus sibogae (Schepman, 1908)
Hadroconus watsoni (Dall, 1927)

References

 Marshall B.A. (1991). Mollusca Gastropoda : Seguenziidae from New Caledonia and the Loyalty Islands. In A. Crosnier & P. Bouchet (Eds) Résultats des campagnes Musorstom, vol. 7. Mémoires du Muséum National d'Histoire Naturelle, A, 150:41-109

External links
 Quinn J. (1987). A revision of the Seguenziacea Verrill, 1884. II. The new genera Hadroconus, Rotellenzia, and Asthelys. Nautilus 101(2): 59-68

 
Seguenziidae